The Pirate Party (short: PIRATA, "Pirate") is a political party in Spain based on the model of the Swedish Pirate Party. It was registered by the Ministry of Interior on 6 December 2006.

The party pays attention to citizen's rights and freedom, proposes a reform of the Information Society Services Law of Spain (Spanish: Ley de Servicios de la Sociedad de Información de España - LSSI), and proposes the creation of appropriate legislation for RFID. Furthermore, the party requests the accessibility of culture, and the consideration of the Internet as a basic and neutral service. PIRATA opposes any kind of Internet censorship, as well as any charges on digital media and the Internet. The party favors a declination of private monopolies and software patents. The party also proposes the use of free software in the administration.

Electoral history

General elections in Spain, 2011 
On 20 November 2011 general elections were held of which the winner was the conservative People's Party. The Pirate Party did not manage to obtain any electoral representation.

Congress of Deputies

Senate

See also
Pirate Party (Sweden)
Pirate Party of Catalonia
Pirate Party of Galicia

References

External links
Official website

 
Spain
2006 establishments in Spain
Political parties established in 2006